William Depham (fl. 1391–1395) was an English politician.

He was a Member (MP) of the Parliament of England for Wycombe in 1391, 1393, 1394 and 1395.

References

Year of birth missing
Year of death missing
English MPs 1391
People from Buckinghamshire
English MPs 1393
English MPs 1394
English MPs 1395